This is a list of African auto racing and moto racing circuits sorted by country.

Angola
 Autódromo de Benguela, Benguela
 Autódromo de Luanda, Luanda

Morocco

Historic circuits
 Agadir Circuit
 Ain-Diab Circuit, Ain-Diab
 Anfa Circuit
 Casablanca Street Circuit

Street circuit
 Marrakech Street Circuit, Marrakech

Mozambique

Inactive circuits
 Circuito de Lourenço Marques, Maputo
 Lourenço Marques street circuit, Maputo

Namibia

Permanent circuits
 Tony Rust Raceway, Windhoek, Khomas

Senegal

Permanent circuits
 Circuit de Dakar Baobabs, Thiès Region

South Africa

Street tracks
 Durban street circuit

Permanent tracks
 Blue Circle Raceway, Lichtenburg
 Killarney Motor Racing Complex (WPMC), Cape Town
 Kyalami, Gauteng
 Phakisa, Welkom, Free State
 Prince George Circuit, East London
 Aldo Scribante Circuit, Port Elizabeth
 Zwartkops Raceway, Zwartkop, Gauteng
 Red Star Raceway, Mpumalanga
 Midvaal Raceway, Gauteng—Previously Race Rite Raceway
 Dezzi Raceway, KwaZulu-Natal
 The rock raceway Brakpan

Drag strips
 Tarlton International Raceway, Krugersdorp

Inactive tracks
 Roy Hesketh Circuit, Pietermaritzburg
 WesBank Raceway, Gauteng

Kart tracks
 Celso Scribante Kart Track, Port Elizabeth
 KZN Kart Club, Camperdown, KwaZulu-Natal, KwaZulu-Natal
 Action Kart Circuit - Vereeniging Kart Circuit, Vereeniging, Gauteng
 Killarney kart circuit, Cape Town
 Zwartkops kart circuit, Zwartkop, Pretoria

Zimbabwe

 Belvedere Airfield, Belvedere
 Breedon Everard Raceway, Bulawayo
 Donnybrook Raceway, Harare
 James McNeillie Circuit, Bulawayo

See also

 List of motor racing tracks
 List of motor racing tracks in Asia

References

Africa
Motorsport in Africa